Panic is Alexei Sayle's third album, released in 1985. This was his final album; he would later record some audiobooks in the late 1990s.

Panic spawned the singles "Didn't You Kill My Brother?" and "Meanwhile". The former was later featured in The Comic Strip Presents 1988 film of the same name written by Sayle. "Didn't You Kill My Brother?" is also a phrase Sayle has used often in his works, such as in an episode of The Young Ones. A version of the song "Panic" appears in a second series episode of Alexei Sayle's Stuff.

A 12-inch acetate exists of a 7-minute extended version of Play That Funky Music Jewish Boy, which suggests that there was a third single planned from this album.

Track listing

Charts

Personnel

Performers 

 Alexei Sayle - Vocals
 Tessa Niles - Backing vocals (on 1; 4); vocals on "Word Association"
 Tim Sanders - Tenor saxophone
 Simon Clarke - Alto saxophone
 Luke Tunney - Trumpet
 Mark King - Bass on "Funky Music"

Production and photography 

 Chaz Jankel - Production, guitar, bass, synth, piano, programming
 Philip Bagenal - Production
 Don Frazer - Production on "Do Dis Do Dat"
 Ian McTavish - Production on "Do Dis Do Dat"
 Eric Watson - Photography

References

External links
 

1985 albums
Alexei Sayle albums
CBS Records albums
1980s comedy albums